H. Lawrence Hoffman (23 October 1911 – 20 January 1977) was a commercial book jacket designer, illustrator,calligrapher and painter who worked in New York City. He illustrated book covers for over 25 publishing companies, including Alfred A Knopf, Pocket Books, Popular Library, Macmillan, Simon & Schuster, The Viking Press, and Random House. Over the course of his career, he illustrated over 600 book jacket covers.

Hoffman graduated from the Rhode Island School of Design (RISD) in 1934 and then completed two years of post graduate study in Commercial Art from RISD. He moved to New York City with the $200 he was awarded for winning a competition to design a coin for the 1936 300 year Rhode Island Tercentennial.  He began his career as an Art Director at the A.M. Sneider Advertising Company (1938–1941) and at Immerman Art Studios (1941–?). After leaving Immerman, he worked as a free-lance artist and book illustrator for the remainder of his career. He also taught illustration and lettering at The Cooper Union (1960-1967) and was a Professor of Art at C.W. Post University (1967–1976).

Hoffman began his career doing drawings for the pulp magazine, "Thrilling Mystery Magazine", A Ned Pines publication, and book cover illustrations for the emerging mass market paperback industry that included Pocket Books, Bantam Books, and Green Dragon. Beginning around 1943, Hoffman illustrated almost all of the first 100 paperback covers for Popular Library. Hoffman repeated the cover illustration as a smaller line drawing on the title page.
 

In 1947, he won a prestigious commission to design the cover, frontispieces and 21 full or half page illustrations for “The Canterbury Tales of Geoffrey Chaucer: A New Modern English Prose Translation by R.M.Lumiansky” published in 1948 by Simon & Schuster.  The book was selected as one of the 50 best books of the year by the American Institute of Graphic Arts.

Father to David Hoffman, filmmaker.

Illustrated 
 
 
 
 
The Canterbury Tales of Geoffrey Chaucer Translation by R.M. Lumiansky, Simon and Schuster, New York, 1948 
Beyond the Barriers of Space and Time by Judith Merril, hard cover, Random House; 1st edition (November 1, 1954)
Father Marquette and the Great Rivers by August Derleth, Vision Books, 1955
Cross in the West by Mark Boesch, Vision Books 1956
Fighting Father Duffy by Jim Bishop and Virginia Lee Bishop, Vision Books, New York, 1956
Governor All Smith by James A. Farley and James C. G. Conniff, Vision Book, Farrar, Straus & Cudahy, New York, 1959
More Champions in Sports and Spirit by Ed Fitzgerald (1919-2001)(sports writer, editor Sport magazine), Farrar, Straus and Cudahy, 1959
The Canterbury tales of Geoffrey Chaucer : a new modern English prose translation, translated by R.M. Lumiansky,  Hoffman, Washington Square Press, 1960, 1967
Alien Art, by Gordon R. Dickson, hardcover, E. P. Dutton (1973) 
  The Building Book: About Houses the World Over by Evelyn E. Smith, Howell Soskin publishers, New York, 1972

Cover Art 

Some of the numerous book covers that H. Lawrence Hoffman illustrated:
13 White Tulips, by Frances Crane, Random House, 1953
 
Lady Killer, by William Hardy, A Red Badge Mystery, Dodd, Mead & Co, 1957
New York City Folklore, by B.A. Botkin, Random House, 1956
African Poison Murders, by Elsbeth Huxley, Popular Library, #100, 1946
Mother Finds a Body, by Gypsy Rose Lee, Popular Library #37, 1944
Congo Song, by Stuart Cloete, Popular Library #110, 1945
Dead of the Night, by John Rhode, Popular Library #56, 1945
Petro's War, by Alki Zei, E.P Dutton & co, 1972
The Angry Hills, by Leon Uris, Random House, 1955
 
The Pocket Book of Dog Stories, by Harold Berman (editor); MacKinley Kantor (introduction), Pocket Books, Inc., 1942
 The Criminal C.O.D. by Phoebe Atwood Taylor aka Alice Tilton, Popular Library 14, 1943
 Murder in Shinbone Alley by Helen Reilly, Popular Library # 20 1st Printing, 1943
 Mutiny on the Bounty (novel) by Charles Nordhoff and James Norman Hall, Pocket Books # 216, 1943
McKee of Centre Street, by Helen Reilly, Popular Library paperback, 1944
The House on the Roof, by Mignon G. Eberhart, Popular Library #17, 1944
Mr. Pinkerton Has the Clue, by David Frome, Popular Library paperback, 1944
The Happy Highwayman, by Leslie Charteris, Pocket Books paperback (No. 272), January 1945 
 Challenge for Three by David Garth, Popular Library # 84, 1945
Sing a Song of Homicide, by James R. Langham, Popular Library paperback, 1945
Murder in the Willett Family, by Rufus King, Popular Library paperback, 1945
Sound of Revelry, by Octavus Roy Cohen, Popular Library, 1945
The Smiler with the Knife, by Nicholas Blake, Popular Library paperback, 1945
It Ain't Hay, by David Dodge, Simon & Schuster, 1946
Timbal Gulch Trail, by Max Brand, Popular Library paperback, 1946
Bucky Follows a Cold Trail, by William MacLeod Raine, Popular Library paperback, 1946
Hasty Wedding, by Mignon G. Eberhart, Popular Library paperback, 1946
Murder in Season, by Octavus Roy Cohen, Popular Library paperback, 1946
 
Rebecca, by Daphne du Maurier, Pocket Books Inc. paperback, 1946
 Drink to Yesterday by Mannining Coles, Bantam Books # 76, 1947
 Murder '97 by Frank Gruber, New York: Rinehart & Company / Murray Hill Mystery 1st Edition 1948
 Lummox by Fannie Hurst, Popular Library #101, 1946

City Boy: The Adventures of Herbie Bookbinder, by Herman Wouk, Simon & Schuster, 1948
We Took to the Woods by Louise Dickinson Rich, Pocket Books, 1948
Earth Abides, by George R. Stewart, Random House, 1949

 A Little Night Music by Mary Jane Ward, Random House, 1951
The Autobiography of Benjamin Franklin, Pocket Books, 1952
The Bridges at Toko-Ri by James A. Michener, 1953
Bring 'em Back by Lillian Brown, Dodd, Mead & Co, N . Y., 1956
Kill My Love, by Kyle Hunt, Simon & Schuster; [Book club ed.] edition (1958)
RIPLEY'S BELIEVE IT OR NOT - 6th series by Robert L. Ripley, Pocket Books, 1959
Widow's Mite by Elizabeth Sanxay Holding, Simon & Schuster, An Inner Sanctum Mystery,1953
 
Now We Are Enemies: The Story of Bunker Hill by Thomas J. Flemming, St. Martin's Press, New York, 1960
The Power and the Glory by Graham Greene, Compass Books / Viking Press, New York, 1961
The News From Karachi by William Wood, Macmillan, New York, 1962
Palace Under the Sea, by Elizabeth P. Heppner, Macmillan (1963)
 The Portable Russian Reader: A collection Newly Translated from Classical and Present-day Authors by Bernard Guilbert Guerney, The Viking Press., New York, 1964
 Modes of Thought by Alfred North Whitehead, New York: Free Press, 1968
Operation Manhunt by Christopher Nicole, Holt Rinehart and Winston 1970
Flight of Exiles by Ben Bova, E. P. Dutton & Co., New York, NY, 1972

References

External links
 H Lawrence Hoffman papers and book jacket images, Cary Graphic Arts Collection at the Rochester Institute of Technology
 Cover photos of Hoffman's books vintage paperback books.
 https://www.flickr.com/photos/42080330@N03/albums/72157644712644134/ Cover photos of Hoffman's vintage paperback books

 Youtube about Hoffman by his son, filmmaker David Hoffman
 Article about 2015 Exhibit of Hoffman's Popular Library Book covers
 History and Images of Popular Library

American illustrators
1911 births
1977 deaths
Rhode Island School of Design alumni